USS Earheart (APD-113), ex-DE-603, was a United States Navy high-speed transport in commission from 1945 to 1946.

Namesake
James Edward Earheart Jr. was born in Cincinnati, Ohio, on 25 April 1913 and was of German descent. He enlisted in the United States Marine Corps on 7 January 1942. During Operation Torch, the Allied amphibious landings in North Africa, on 8 November 1942, Private First Class Earheart was a member of a naval antisabotage party embarked in a British warship which was damaged during the entry into Oran, Algeria. Heroically, he volunteered, in the face of continuous Vichy French shelling, to swim to a harbor tug whose movements were endangering the men abandoning the warship. He was killed in this effort. Earheart was posthumously awarded the Silver Star for his actions at Oran.

Construction and commissioning
Earheart was laid down as the  USS Earheart (DE-603) on 20 March 1945 by Bethlehem-Hingham Shipyard, Inc., at Hingham, Massachusetts.

Service history 
Earheart conducted shakedown training at Guantanamo Bay, Cuba, during which World War II ended with the surrender of Japan on 15 August 1945. She then moved to Providence, Rhode Island, to celebrate Navy Day on 27 October 1945. Earheart then moved on to Green Cove Springs, Florida, for inactivation.

Decommissioning and disposal
Earheart was decommissioned at Green Cove Springs on 29 April 1946 and berthed there with the Florida Group of the Atlantic Reserve Fleet in the St. Johns River. She was stricken from the Navy List on 12 December 1963.

Mexican Navy service
Earheart was transferred to Mexico on 12 December 1963. In Mexican Navy service she was named ARM Papaloapan (H04) after the Papaloapan River. She was later assigned the new pennant number of B04. Papaloapan ran aground in 1976 and was discarded by the Mexican Navy and scrapped that year.

References

NavSource Online: Amphibious Photo Archive DE-603 / APD-113 Earheart

Crosley-class high speed transports
Ships built in Hingham, Massachusetts
1945 ships
World War II frigates and destroyer escorts of the United States
World War II amphibious warfare vessels of the United States
Crosley-class high speed transports of the Mexican Navy